Sap Yai is a district (amphoe) of Chaiyaphum province, northeastern Thailand.

History
The minor district was separated from Chatturat district on 1 July 1997.

On 15 May 2007, all 81 minor districts were upgraded to full districts. On 24 August the upgrade became official.

Geography
Neighboring districts are (from the north clockwise): Nong Bua Rawe, Chatturat, Bamnet Narong, and Thep Sathit.

Administration
The district is divided into three subdistricts (tambons), which are further subdivided into 33 villages (mubans). There are no municipal (thesaban) areas, and three tambon administrative organizations (TAO).

References

External links
amphoe.com

Sap Yai